Žolt Dér (born 25 March 1983) is a Serbian-born Hungarian former racing cyclist. He rode at the 2014 UCI Road World Championships. Following his retirement, Dér became a coach with the Hungarian Cycling Federation.

Major results

2005
 1st Road race, Serbia and Montenegro National Road Championships
 8th Overall Tour of Greece
 10th Overall Presidential Cycling Tour of Turkey
2006
 1st Road race, Serbia and Montenegro National Road Championships
 1st Stage 4 Tour de Serbie
2007
 Serbian National Road Championships
1st  Road race
2nd Time trial
 1st Banja Luka–Belgrade II
 1st GP Betonexpressz 2000
 Presidential Cycling Tour of Turkey
1st Stages 5 & 7
 1st Stage 2 Tour de Serbie
 5th Classic Beograd–Čačak
 5th GP Palma
 10th Time trial, UCI B World Championships
2008
 1st Stage 5 Tour de Serbie
 Serbian National Road Championships
2nd Time trial
4th Road race
 4th Grand Prix Bourgas
 7th Classic Beograd–Čačak
 10th Overall Vuelta Mexico
2009
 Serbian National Road Championships
1st  Time trial
4th Road race
 1st Overall Grand Prix Cycliste de Gemenc
 2nd Overall Tour de Serbie
2010
 1st  Road race, Serbian National Road Championships
 1st Mayor Cup
 1st Stage 3 Vuelta a Bolivia
 5th Banja Luka–Belgrad II
 6th Banja Luka–Belgrad I
 9th Overall Five Rings of Moscow
2011
 Serbian National Road Championships
1st  Road race
1st  Time trial
 1st Tour of Vojvodina II
 1st Stage 2b Tour of Greece
 8th Central European Tour Miskolc GP
 9th GP Betonexpressz 2000
2012
 4th Overall Tour of Greece
 4th Banja Luka–Belgrad I
 5th Tour of Vojvodina I
 6th Memorial Oleg Dyachenko
 7th Banja Luka–Belgrad II
 10th Tour of Vojvodina II
2013
 Hungarian National Road Championships
2nd Road race
2nd Time trial
 4th Race Horizon Park 1
 5th Central European Tour Budapest GP
 5th Classic Beograd–Čačak
 6th Košice–Miskolc
 6th Banja Luka–Belgrad I
 7th Central European Tour Miskolc GP
 8th Poreč Trophy
 10th Croatia–Slovenia
2014
 4th Road race, Hungarian National Road Championships
 9th Memoriał Henryka Łasaka
 10th Puchar Uzdrowisk Karpackich
2015
 2nd Road race, Hungarian National Road Championships
2016
 Hungarian National Road Championships
2nd Time trial
3rd Road race
2017
 Hungarian National Road Championships
2nd Road race
3rd Time trial
 10th Belgrade–Banja Luka II

References

External links

1983 births
Living people
Hungarian male cyclists
Serbian male cyclists
Sportspeople from Subotica
Hungarians in Vojvodina
European Games competitors for Hungary
Cyclists at the 2015 European Games
21st-century Hungarian people